This is a list of Bulgarian football transfers for the 2018–19 winter transfer window. Only transfers involving a team from the two professional leagues, First League and Second League are listed.

First League

Beroe

In:

Out:

Botev Plovdiv

In:

Out:

Botev Vratsa

In:

Out:

Cherno More

In:

Out:

CSKA Sofia

In:

Out:

Dunav

In:

Out:

Etar

In:

Out:

Levski Sofia

In:

Out:

Lokomotiv Plovdiv

In:

Out:

Ludogorets

In:

Out:

Septemvri Sofia

In:

Out:

Slavia Sofia

In:

Out:

Vereya

In:

Out:

Vitosha Bistritsa

In:

Out:

Second League

Arda

In:

Out:

Botev Galabovo

In:

Out:

Chernomorets Balchik

In:

Out:

CSKA 1948

In:

Out:

Dobrudzha

In:

Out:

Kariana

In:

Out:

Litex

In:

Out:

Lokomotiv GO

In:

Out:

Lokomotiv Sofia

In:

Out:

Ludogorets II

In:

Out:

Montana

In:

Out:

Nesebar

In:

Out:

Pirin Blagoevgrad

In:

Out:

Pomorie

In:

Out:

Strumska Slava

In:

Out:

Tsarsko Selo

In:

Out:

References

Bulgaria
Winter 2018-19